Eucalyptus nigrifunda, commonly known as desert wandoo, is a species of tree that is endemic to a small area in central Western Australia. It has smooth reddish brown bark with some rough, flaky black bark near the base of the trunk, lance-shaped adult leaves, flower buds in groups of nine, white flowers and cylindrical to barrel-shaped fruit.

Description
It has rough, flaky black bark on the base of the trunk, smooth reddish brown bark above. Flowering has been recorded in July and the flowers are white.

Taxonomy and naming
Eucalyptus nigrifunda was first formally described in 1991 by Ian Brooker and Stephen Hopper in the journal Nuytsia from specimens they collected in 1984. The specific epithet (nigrifunda) is from the Latin nigri meaning "black" and fundus, "bottom" referring to the dark base of the trunk.

Distribution and habitat
Desert wandoo is found on breakaways of decomposing granite in a small area in the Great Victoria Desert where it grows in sandy-clay soils.

Conservation status
This eucalypt is classified as "Priority Four" by the Government of Western Australia Department of Parks and Wildlife, meaning that is rare or near threatened.

See also
 List of Eucalyptus species

References

Eucalypts of Western Australia
Trees of Australia
nigrifunda
Myrtales of Australia
Plants described in 1991
Taxa named by Ian Brooker
Taxa named by Stephen Hopper
Endemic flora of Western Australia